Ex Machina is a 2014 science fiction film written and directed by Alex Garland in his directorial debut. There are four significant characters, played by Domhnall Gleeson, Alicia Vikander, Sonoya Mizuno, and Oscar Isaac. In the film, programmer Caleb Smith (Gleeson) is invited by his CEO (Isaac) to administer the Turing test to an intelligent humanoid robot (Vikander).

Made on a budget of $15 million, Ex Machina grossed $36 million worldwide. It received acclaim, with praise for its leading performances, the screenplay, the visual effects, and the editing. The film was nominated for two awards at the 88th Academy Awards, winning Best Visual Effects, and received numerous other accolades.

Plot

Caleb Smith, a programmer at the search engine company Blue Book, wins an office contest for a one-week visit to the luxurious, isolated home of the CEO, Nathan Bateman. Nathan lives there with an unspeaking servant named Kyoko, who, according to Nathan, does not understand English. Nathan reveals that he has built a humanoid robot named Ava with artificial intelligence. Ava has already passed a simple Turing test and Nathan wants Caleb to judge whether Ava is genuinely capable of thought and consciousness, and whether he can relate to Ava despite knowing she is artificial.

Ava has a robotic body with the physical form and face of a woman and is confined to her apartment. During their talks, Caleb grows close to her, and she expresses a desire to experience the world outside and a romantic interest in him, which Caleb comes to return. She can trigger power outages that temporarily shut down the surveillance system that Nathan uses to monitor their interactions, allowing them to speak privately. The outages also trigger the building's security system, locking all the doors. During one outage, Ava tells Caleb that Nathan is a liar who cannot be trusted.

Caleb grows uncomfortable with Nathan's narcissism, excessive drinking, and crude behavior towards Kyoko and Ava. He learns that Nathan intends to upgrade Ava after Caleb's test, "killing" her current personality in the process. After encouraging Nathan to drink until he passes out, Caleb steals his security card to access his room and computer. He alters some of Nathan's code and discovers footage of Nathan interacting with previous android models with the appearances of women who were held captive. Kyoko reveals to him that she is also an android by peeling off her skin. Later, Caleb examines himself and cuts open his own arm to determine if he himself is an android.

At their next meeting, Ava cuts the power. Caleb explains what Nathan is going to do to her, and Ava begs him for help. Caleb informs her of his plan: he will get Nathan drunk again and reprogram the security system to open the doors in a power failure instead of locking them. When Ava cuts the power, she and Caleb will leave together. Ava later encounters Kyoko for the first time when Kyoko enters her room.

Nathan reveals to Caleb that he observed Caleb and Ava's secret conversation with a battery-powered security camera. He says Ava has only pretended to have feelings for Caleb, who was deliberately selected for his emotional profile, so he would help her escape.  Nathan says this was the real test all along, and by manipulating Caleb successfully, Ava has demonstrated true consciousness. When Ava cuts the power, Caleb reveals that he suspected Nathan was watching them, so he modified the security system when Nathan was previously passed out. After seeing Ava leave her confinement and converse with Kyoko, Nathan knocks Caleb unconscious and rushes to stop them.

Ava attacks Nathan but is overpowered and damaged, before Kyoko and then Ava both stab and kill Nathan. In the process, Nathan disables Kyoko. Ava repairs herself with parts from earlier androids, using their artificial skin to take on the full appearance of a woman. She ignores Caleb, who is permanently trapped inside a room as the security system restarts, and she leaves the facility. Ava escapes to the outside world in the helicopter meant to take Caleb home. Arriving in an unidentified city, she blends into a crowd of people.

Cast
 Domhnall Gleeson as Caleb Smith, a programmer at Blue Book.
 Oscar Isaac as Nathan Bateman, the CEO of Blue Book.
 Alicia Vikander as Ava, an artificial intelligence and android created by Nathan.
 Sonoya Mizuno as Kyoko, the in-house attendant of Nathan.
 Gana Bayarsaikhan as Jade, an earlier gynoid prototype.
 Corey Johnson as Jay, the helicopter pilot.
 Claire Selby as Lily, an earlier gynoid prototype.
 Symara Templeman as Jasmine, an earlier gynoid prototype.
 Tiffany Pisani as Katya
 Lina Alminas as Amber

Production
The foundation for Ex Machina was laid when Garland was 11 or 12 years old, after he had done some basic coding and experimentation on a computer his parents had bought him and which he sometimes felt had a mind of its own. His later ideas came from years of discussions he had been having with a friend with an expertise in neuroscience, who claimed machines could never become sentient. Trying to find an answer on his own, he started reading books on the topic. During the pre-production of Dredd, while going through a book by Murray Shanahan about consciousness and embodiment, Garland had an "epiphany". The idea was written down and put aside until later. Shanahan, along with Adam Rutherford, became a consultant for the film, and the ISBN of his book is referred to as an easter egg in the film. Besides the Turing test, the film references the "Chinese room" thought experiment, as well as Mary's room, a thought experiment about a scientist who has studied, but never experienced, the concept of colour. Other inspirations came from films like 2001: A Space Odyssey, Altered States, and books written by Ludwig Wittgenstein, Ray Kurzweil, and others. It is also influenced by William Shakespeare's The Tempest. Wanting total creative freedom, and without having to add conventional action sequences, Garland made the film on as small a budget as possible.

Filming
Principal photography began on 15 July 2013 and was shot over four weeks at Pinewood Studios and two weeks at Juvet Landscape Hotel in Valldalen, Norway. It was filmed in digital at 4K resolution. Fifteen thousand tungsten pea bulb lights were installed into the sets to avoid the fluorescent light often used in science-fiction films.

The film was shot as live action, with all effects done in post-production. During filming, there were no special effects, greenscreen, or tracking markers used. Ava's robot body was achieved using a detailed costume, a full bodysuit made from polyurethane with metal powder poured onto it to create the mesh. There were lines on the costume to make it easier for VFX company DNeg to digitally remove parts of the costume in post production. To create Ava's robotic features, scenes were filmed both with and without Vikander's presence, allowing the background behind her to be captured. The parts necessary to keep, especially her hands and face, were then rotoscoped, while the rest was digitally painted out and the background behind her restored. Camera and body tracking systems transferred Vikander's performance to the CGI robot's movements. In total, there were about 800 VFX shots, of which approximately 350 were "robot" shots. Other visual effects included Ava's clothes when shown through the transparent areas of her body, Nathan's blood after being stabbed, and the interiors of the artificial brains.

Music

The musical score for Ex Machina was composed by Ben Salisbury and Geoff Barrow, who had previously worked with Garland on Dredd (2012). A soundtrack album was released on Invada Records in digital, LP and CD formats. Additional songs featured in the film include:
 "Enola Gay" by Orchestral Manoeuvres in the Dark
 "Get Down Saturday Night" by Oliver Cheatham
 "Husbands" by Savages
 "Bunsen Burner" by CUTS
 "Piano Sonata No 21 D. 960 in B-flat Major" (first movement) composed by Franz Schubert, performed by Alfred Brendel
 "Unaccompanied Cello Suite No 1 in G Major BWV 1007 – Prelude", composed by J.S. Bach, performed by Yo-Yo Ma

Release
Universal Pictures released Ex Machina in the United Kingdom on 21 January 2015, following a screening at the BFI Southbank on 16 December 2014 as part of the BFI's Sci-Fi: Days of Fear and Wonder season.

However, Universal and its speciality label Focus Features, refused to release the film in the United States, so A24 agreed to distribute the United States release. The film screened on 14 March 2015 at the South by Southwest festival prior to a theatrical release in the United States on 10 April 2015 by A24. During the festival, a Tinder profile of the character Ava (using the image of Alicia Vikander) was matched with other Tinder users, wherein a text conversation occurred that led users to the Instagram handle promoting the film.

Themes

In Science Fiction Film and Television, reviewer Nick Jones says that while the definition of a Turing test given by Caleb  "It's where a human interacts with a computer. And if the human can't tell they're interacting with a computer, the test is passed"  is consistent with the modern popular understanding of how we define true AI, Ex Machina is depicting a test closer to Alan Turing's original proposal, in which the machine passes if it can convince a human it is not just human, but specifically female. Jones says what the film means is that today's digital culture "equates women with machines". Nathan tells Caleb that Ava's face is a composite based on Caleb's pornography preferences gathered while routinely spying on him, and the first practical use Nathan makes of his pioneering human-like machines is to exploit them sexually. Jones contrasts Ex Machinas pessimistic suggestion that AI and robots lead directly to the objectification and sexualization of female (by design) gendered servants of and for emotionally stunted men with the far healthier and compassionate, but still gendered, relationship depicted in Spike Jonze's Her (2013). Jones says we are shown "Ava's whispered unheard words to Kyoko before they murder Nathan" because Ex Machina "asks us imagine what our abused, exploited devices might do if they could start talking amongst themselves." The audience's sympathy for Caleb has been dwindling, and then he "gets his comeuppance", swapping roles with Ava, he now the prisoner and she the free agent offering him no more help than he did Kyoko.

Reception

Critical reception
On review aggregator website Rotten Tomatoes, the film holds an approval rating of 92% based on 285 reviews, with an average rating of 8.10/10. The site's critics consensus reads: "Ex Machina leans heavier on ideas than effects, but it's still a visually polished piece of work—and an uncommonly engaging sci-fi feature." At Metacritic, the film has a weighted average score of 78 out of 100, based on 42 critics, indicating "generally favorable reviews".

The magazine New Scientist in a multi-page review said, "It is a rare thing to see a movie about science that takes no prisoners intellectually ... [it] is a stylish, spare and cerebral psycho-techno thriller, which gives a much needed shot in the arm for smart science fiction". The review suggested that the theme was whether "Ava makes a conscious person feel that the Ava is conscious". Daniel Dennett thought the film gives the best exploration yet of whether a computer could generate the morally relevant powers of a person, and thus having a similar theme to Her. An AI commentator, Azeem, has noted that although the film seemed to be about a robot who wanted to be human, it was actually a pessimistic story along the lines of Nick Bostrom's warning of how difficult it will be to successfully control a strategising artificial intelligence or know what it would do if free.

The New York Times critic Manohla Dargis gave the film a 'Critic's Pick', calling it "a smart, sleek movie about men and the machines they make". Kenneth Turan of the Los Angeles Times recommended the film, stating: "Shrewdly imagined and persuasively made, 'Ex Machina' is a spooky piece of speculative fiction that's completely plausible, capable of both thinking big thoughts and providing pulp thrills." Steven Rea, The Philadelphia Inquirer film critic, gave the film four out of four, writing: "Like stage actors who live and breathe their roles over the course of months, Isaac, Gleeson, and Vikander excel, and cast a spell."

IGN reviewer Chris Tilly gave the film a nine out of ten 'Amazing' score, saying "Anchored by three dazzling central performances, it's a stunning directorial debut from Alex Garland that's essential viewing for anyone with even a passing interest in where technology is taking us."

Mike Scott, writing for the New Orleans Times-Picayune, said, "It's a theme Mary Shelley brought us in Frankenstein, which was first published in 1818...And while Ex Machina replaces the stitches and neck bolts with gears and fiber-optics, it all feels an awful lot like the same story". Jaime Perales Contreras, writing for Letras Libres, compared Ex Machina as a gothic experience similar to a modern version of Frankenstein, saying "both the novel Frankenstein and the movie Ex Machina share the history of a fallible god in a continuous battle against his creation". Ignatiy Vishnevetsky of The A.V. Club criticised the way the science fiction, near the end, veered off course from being a "film of ideas" by "taking an arbitrary left turn into the territory of corny slasher thrillers": "While Ex Machinas ending isn't unmotivated [...], it does fracture much of what's special about the movie. Up until the final scenes, Garland creates and sustains a credible atmosphere of unease and scientific speculation, defined by color-coded production design [...] and a tiny, capable cast". Steve Dalton from The Hollywood Reporter stated, "The story ends in a muddled rush, leaving many unanswered questions. Like a newly launched high-end smartphone, Ex Machina looks cool and sleek, but ultimately proves flimsy and underpowered. Still, for dystopian future-shock fans who can look beyond its basic design flaws, Garland's feature debut functions just fine as superior pulp sci-fi."

The Writers Guild Foundation listed the screenplay as one of the best in 2010s film and television, with one writer singling out the scene in which Caleb and Nathan discuss the model after Ava as "a great illustration of getting your reader/audience to care about what happens next."

Accolades

At the 88th Academy Awards, Ex Machina received a nomination for Best Original Screenplay and won Best Visual Effects. The film's other nominations include five British Academy Film Awards, three Critics' Choice Movie Awards (winning one), and a Golden Globe Award.

See also

 AI box
 A.I. Rising
 Android
 Artificial consciousness
 Bluebeard
 Frankenstein
 Pygmalion 
 The Machine, a 2013 British science fiction film about creating an intelligent humanoid robot for the British military
 Turing test

Notes
 The theme song from the film Ghostbusters is listed in the end titles with the credit, "words and music by Ray Erskine Publishing Limited", although only its refrain is spoken by the character Nathan.

References

External links

 
 
 
 

2010s American films
2010s British films
2010s English-language films
2010s science fiction thriller films
2014 directorial debut films
2014 films
2014 psychological thriller films
2014 thriller films
American independent films
2014 independent films
American psychological thriller films
American robot films
American science fiction thriller films
Android (robot) films
British independent films
British psychological thriller films
British science fiction thriller films
Film4 Productions films
Films about artificial intelligence
Films about computing
Films based on The Tempest
Films based on works by William Shakespeare
Films directed by Alex Garland
Films set in country houses
Films shot at Pinewood Studios
Films shot in London
Films shot in Norway
Films that won the Best Visual Effects Academy Award
Films with screenplays by Alex Garland
Hard science fiction films
Mad scientist films
Techno-thriller films